Rose Madder is a horror/fantasy novel by American writer Stephen King, published in 1995. It deals with the effects of domestic violence (which King had touched upon before in the novels It, Insomnia, Dolores Claiborne, Needful Things, and many others) and, unusually for a King novel, relies for its fantastic element on Greek mythology. In his memoir, On Writing, King states that Rose Madder and Insomnia are "stiff, trying-too-hard novels."

Plot
In 1985, police officer Norman Daniels brutally beats his wife Rosie while she is four months pregnant, resulting in a miscarriage. Rosie considers leaving Norman, but dismisses the idea because Norman specializes in finding missing persons. The short-tempered Norman has recently been accused of assaulting and raping a black woman named Wendy Yarrow, and the subsequent lawsuit and internal affairs investigation has made him even more volatile. Nine years later, Rosie still lives with and takes abuse from her husband. One day, she notices a drop of blood on their bedsheet and realizes that her continued life with Norman could eventually kill her. Taking Norman's credit card, Rosie departs on a bus to an unfamiliar city in the Midwest, with no clear plan of action. At the bus station, she meets a good-natured man named Peter Slowik, who guides her to a local women's shelter. She quickly makes new friends, including the owner of the shelter, Anna Stevenson, who helps Rosie find a small apartment and a job as a hotel maid. A few weeks later, Rosie decides to pawn her engagement ring, but finds that the ring's "diamond" is fake. In the pawn shop, her attention is drawn to a painting which depicts a woman in a rose madder gown. Fascinated, she trades her ring for the painting.

On the street, Rosie is stopped by a man named Rob Lefferts, a customer at the pawn shop, who asks her to read an excerpt from a book. Rob likes Rosie's voice and offers her a job recording audiobooks. Some time later, Bill Steiner, the pawn shop owner, asks Rosie out on a date. Rosie believes that her life is improving, and gradually notices that the painting is changing and expanding. Eventually she is able to travel through it. On the other side, she is met by Dorcas, who resembles Wendy Yarrow. She also sees the lady in the painting, whom she calls "Rose Madder" because of her dress and her apparent insanity. Rose Madder asks Rosie to rescue her baby from an underground labyrinth guarded by the blind, one-eyed bull Erinyes, who orients by smell. Dorcas leads Rosie to the temple grounds and warns her of the dangers and trials that await. Dorcas cannot enter the labyrinth due to a mysterious illness that she and her mistress are afflicted with. Rosie ventures into the temple alone, and she ponders the reality of her situation. Rosie manages to save the child, whom she names Carolina, and Rose Madder promises to repay her. Waking up the next morning, Rosie decides that everything that had happened was a dream.

Meanwhile, Norman conducts a search for Rosie, having resolved to kill her. He tracks down the city Rosie is residing in and gradually loses his self-control; he begins killing people who have some connection to Rosie, including Peter and Anna. When Norman catches Rosie returning from a walk with Bill, she flees from him into her apartment and lures him into the painting, where Rose Madder kills him. Rose gives Rosie some seeds and makes her promise to "remember the tree". Rosie exits Rose's world and burns the painting. Several years later, Rosie is married to Bill, with whom she has a daughter. However, she experiences outbursts of rage characteristic of Rose Madder. Rosie recalls her promise and plants a seed near a lake, and the tree that grows from it helps restrain Rosie's aggression.

Adaptations
In 1996, HBO Pictures acquired the rights to the novel to make a television movie, making the first HBO's film based on Stephen King's novel. Although, HBO turned it down and the project never came to fruition.

A film adaptation of Rose Madder was in development in 2011, but the project fell apart.

There was an audiobook made narrated by Blair Brown.

Connections to other King works
The character of Cynthia Smith appeared in Desperation.
In the prologue, Rose is reading Misery's Journey, an entry in the fictional series of books written by the main character in King's novel, Misery.
The city of Lud from The Dark Tower appears in this novel.

References

1995 American novels
American horror novels
Novels by Stephen King
Classical mythology in popular culture
Viking Press books
Domestic violence in fiction
Feminist novels